The Max Roach 4 Plays Charlie Parker is an album by American jazz drummer Max Roach featuring tracks associated with Charlie Parker recorded in late 1957 and 1958 and released on the EmArcy label. It is also the first album to feature Roach playing without a piano.

Reception

Allmusic awarded the album 4 stars stating "this set is generally fine although the lack of a piano is really felt on some of this material".

Track listing
All compositions by Charlie Parker except as indicated
 "Yardbird Suite" - 3:55     
 "Confirmation" - 4:28     
 "Ko-Ko" - 7:59     
 "Billie's Bounce" - 5:37     
 "Au Privave" - 4:19     
 "Parker's Mood" - 8:23     
 "Raoul" (Max Roach) - 4:50 Bonus track on CD reissue     
 "This Time the Dream's on Me" (Harold Arlen, Johnny Mercer) - 5:21 Bonus track on CD reissue      
 "Tune-Up" (Eddie "Cleanhead" Vinson) - 7:46 Bonus track on CD reissue      
 "Anthropology (Thriving on a Riff)" (Dizzy Gillespie, Parker) - 5:06 Bonus track on CD reissue   
Recorded at Fine Recording in New York City on December 20, 1957 (tracks 7-9), December 23, 1957 (tracks 1, 2, 5 & 10) and at Nola's Penthouse Sound Studios in New York City on April 11, 1958 (tracks 3, 4 & 6)

Personnel 
Max Roach - drums
Kenny Dorham - trumpet
George Coleman (tracks 3, 4 & 6), Hank Mobley (tracks 1, 2, 5 & 7-10) - tenor saxophone
Nelson Boyd (tracks 3, 4 & 6), George Morrow (tracks 1, 2, 5 & 7-10) - bass

References 

1959 albums
Max Roach albums
EmArcy Records albums